The men's decathlon event at the 2019 Summer Universiade was held on 9 and 10 July at the Stadio San Paolo in Naples.

Medalists

Results

100 metres
Wind:Heat 1: +1.0 m/s, Heat 2: -0.7 m/s

Long jump

Shot put

High jump

400 metres

110 metres hurdles
Wind:Heat 1: -0.2 m/s, Heat 2: -1.8 m/s

Discus throw

Pole vault

Javelin throw

1500 metres

Final standings

References

Decathlon
2019